Minha Família Perfeita is 2022 Brazilian comedy film, directed by Felipe Joffily and starring Isabelle Drummond and Rafael Infante, based in a foreign script.

The movie was released theatrically in Brazil on September 8, 2022 by Walt Disney Studios Motion Pictures under the Buena Vista International label.

Plot
Fred is a successful advertising to search for the woman of your dreams. One day he meets Denise, who after some time together, accepts only be sought in marriage after meeting Fred's relatives, which is ashamed to present his eccentric Italian family. No choice, he makes a date in their work, but Denise confuses the actors of an advertisement by Fred 's family, who hires them to represent them . But he did not expect the new family would be worse to deal with than his real family.

Cast
 Isabelle Drummond as Denise
 Rafael Infante as Fred
 Julia Dalavia as Debora

References

Brazilian comedy films
Films shot in Rio de Janeiro (city)
Buena Vista International films
2022 films